Love Rules is the fourth studio album by Canadian country music singer-songwriter Carolyn Dawn Johnson. The album was released through iTunes in the United States on July 21, 2010. The album was also released on August 10, 2010 in Canada through Dancing Lily Music and Universal Music Canada.

Track listing

Chart performance

Singles

References

2010 albums
Carolyn Dawn Johnson albums
Albums produced by Frank Rogers (record producer)
Universal Music Canada albums